Tavern Creek may refer to:

Tavern Creek (Missouri River), a stream in Missouri
Tavern Creek (Osage River), a stream in Missouri